This is a list of  College Football Hall of Fame members who have been inducted as coaches.  As of the 2017 inductions, 214 individuals have been inducted as coaches since the College Football Hall of Fame was established in 1951.

Details

Active coaches 
Six individuals have coached as College Football Hall of Fame inductees:
 John Ralston was inducted in 1992 following his tenures with Utah State (1959–1962) and Stanford (1963–1971).  He came out of retirement in 1993 to coach San Jose State and remained active through the 1996 season.
 Chris Ault was inducted in 2002 following two stints with Nevada (1976–1992 and 1994–1995).  He returned as head coach at Nevada from 2004 to 2012.
 Bobby Bowden was inducted in 2006 and remained active as a head coach with Florida State until his retirement in 2009.
 John Gagliardi was also inducted in 2006 and remained active with Saint John's in Minnesota until he retired in 2012.
 Joe Paterno was inducted in 2007 and remained as a head coach at Penn State until he was fired during the 2011 season.
 Bill Snyder was inducted in 2015 as an active head coach for the Kansas State Wildcats. He remained Kansas State's head coach though the 2018 season.

Time frame
Walter Camp first became a head coach in 1888 and is the earliest on the list to be named a head coach.  Lloyd Carr first became a head coach in 1995 and is the most recent head coach appointee on the list.  Edward K. Hall was a head coach for only two years, in 1892 and 1893, while John Gagliardi was head coach for 64 years before retiring at the end of the 2012 season.

Win–loss records
Edward K. Hall and John Gagliardi have, respectively, the fewest wins (10) and most wins (489) on the list.  Walter Camp has the fewest losses at five while Amos Alonzo Stagg has the most losses at 199.  Stagg also has the most games resulting in a tie at 35.  Multiple coaches have finished their career with zero ties, and overtime rules in college football were introduced in 1996 which make ties impossible in the period since.  Larry Kehres has the highest win percentage at .929; Walter Camp is second at .925.  Tuss McLaughry has the lowest win percentage at .490.  He is only coach on the list under the .500 mark.

List of College Football Hall of Fame coaches

See also
 List of College Football Hall of Fame inductees (players, A–K)
 List of College Football Hall of Fame inductees (players, L–Z)

References

 List of College Football Hall of Fame inductees (coaches)